In digital communications shaping codes are a method of encoding that changes the distribution of signals to improve efficiency.

Description
Typical   digital communication systems uses M-Quadrature Amplitude Modulation(QAM) to communicate through an analog channel (specifically a communication channel with Gaussian noise). For Higher bit rates(M) the minimum signal-to-noise ratio (SNR) required by a QAM system with Error Correcting Codes is about 1.53 dB  higher  than minimum SNR required by a Gaussian source(>30% more transmitter power) as given in   Shannon–Hartley theorem

where
C is the channel capacity in bits per second;
B is the bandwidth of the channel in hertz;
 S is the total signal power over the bandwidth and
 N is the total noise power over the bandwidth.
S/N is the signal-to-noise ratio of the communication signal to the Gaussian noise interference expressed as a straight power ratio (not as decibels).

This 1.53 dB  difference is called the shaping gap.  Typically digital system will encode bits with uniform probability to maximize the entropy.   Shaping code act as buffer between digital sources and modulator communication system. They will receive uniformly distributed data and convert it to Gaussian like distribution before presenting to the modulator. Shaping codes are helpful in reducing transmit power and thus reduce the cost of Power amplifier and the interference caused to other users in the vicinity.

Application

Some of the methods used for shaping are described in the trellis shaping paper by Dr. G. D. Forney Jr.

Shell mapping is  used  in V.34 modems  to get a shaping gain of .8 dB.
All the shaping schemes in the literature try to reduce the transmitted signal power. In future this may have find application in wireless networks where the interference from other nodes are becoming the major issue.

References 

Trellis shaping for modulation systems 

Digital audio
Data transmission
Error detection and correction
Information theory
Telecommunication theory